Diego Marcelo Fretes Zarza (born June 6, 1988) is a Paraguayan footballer who plays as a midfielder for Persepam Madura United in the Indonesia Super League.

References

External links
 Profile at liga-indonesia.co.id

1988 births
Living people
Paraguayan footballers
Paraguayan expatriate footballers
Association football forwards
Paraguayan expatriate sportspeople in Brazil
Expatriate footballers in Brazil
Paraguayan expatriate sportspeople in Indonesia
Expatriate footballers in Indonesia
Liga 1 (Indonesia) players
Persepam Madura Utama players